Lawrence Willis (born July 12, 1981, in Lafayette, Louisiana) is an American triple jumper.

He finished fifth at the 2007 Pan American Games. The same year he competed at the 2007 World Championships, without reaching the final.

His personal best jump is 16.97 metres, achieved in June 2007 in Indianapolis.

References

 

1981 births
Living people
American male triple jumpers
USA Indoor Track and Field Championships winners
Athletes (track and field) at the 2007 Pan American Games
Pan American Games track and field athletes for the United States